The Kirsch operator or Kirsch compass kernel is a non-linear edge detector that finds the maximum edge strength in a few predetermined directions. It is named after the computer scientist Russell Kirsch.

Mathematical description 
The operator takes a single kernel mask and rotates it in 45 degree increments through all 8 compass directions: N, NW, W, SW, S, SE, E, and NE. The edge magnitude of the Kirsch operator is calculated as the maximum magnitude across all directions:

where z enumerates the compass direction kernels g:
 and so on. 

The edge direction is defined by the mask that produces the maximum edge magnitude.

Example images

References 

Feature detection (computer vision)